The qualification phase of the 2015 African U-20 Championship decided the participating teams of the final tournament. A total of eight teams will play in the final tournament, to be hosted by Senegal.

Qualification ties were played on a home-and-away two-legged basis. If the sides were level on aggregate after the second leg, the away goals rule was applied, and if still level, the tie proceeded directly to a penalty shoot-out (no extra time was played).

Teams
A total of 43 teams entered the qualification phase.

First round

The first legs were scheduled for 4–6 April 2014, and the second legs were scheduled for 25–27 April 2014.

|}

Notes

Mozambique won 4–2 on aggregate.

Malawi won 3–2 on aggregate.

Lesotho won 4–2 on aggregate.

0–0 on aggregate. Tanzania won on penalties.

Ethiopia won 5–0 on aggregate.

Burundi won 2–1 on aggregate.

Rwanda won on default.

Sierra Leone won 2–0 on aggregate.

Sudan won 6–0 on aggregate.

2–2 on aggregate. Congo won on penalties.

Liberia won on default.

Ivory Coast won on default.

Libya won 4–0 on aggregate.

Tunisia won 6–1 on aggregate.

Togo won on default.

Second round
The first legs were scheduled for 9–11 May 2014, and the second legs were scheduled for 23–25 May 2014.

|}

Zambia won 4–0 on aggregate.

Malawi won 3–1 on aggregate.

Lesotho won 4–1 on aggregate.

Nigeria won 6–1 on aggregate.

South Africa won 3–0 on aggregate.

Cameroon won 2–1 on aggregate.

Gabon won 1–0 on aggregate.

Ghana won 4–1 on aggregate.

Egypt won 5–0 on aggregate.

3–3 on aggregate. Congo won on penalties.

Ivory Coast won 2–1 on aggregate.

Libya won 4–2 on aggregate.

4–4 on aggregate. Togo won on away goals.

Mali won 3–2 on aggregate.

Third round
The first legs were scheduled for 15–17 August 2014, and the second legs were scheduled for 29–31 August 2014.

|}

Notes

Zambia won 3–1 on aggregate.

Nigeria won on default.

South Africa won 3–2 on aggregate.

Ghana won 4–1 on aggregate.

Congo won 3–2 on aggregate.

Ivory Coast won 4–3 on aggregate.

Mali won 2–1 on aggregate.

Qualified teams
 
 
 
 
 
  (hosts)

References

External links
Orange African Youth Championship Qualifiers, CAFonline.com

U-20 Championship Qualification
Qualification
2015